Arnold Wiktor Masin (born 6 April 1977) is a Polish politician. He was elected to the Sejm on 25 September 2005, getting 4168 votes in 10 Piotrków Trybunalski district as a candidate from the League of Polish Families list. He was a Vice-Minister of Sport in the Cabinet of Jarosław Kaczyński.

See also
Members of Polish Sejm 2005-2007

References

1977 births
Living people
People from Staszów County
Members of the Polish Sejm 2005–2007
League of Polish Families politicians